Hayes Township is a township in Franklin County, Kansas, USA.  As of the 2000 census, its population was 397.

Geography

The streams of East Fork Tauy Creek, Middle Fork Tauy Creek and Spring Creek run through this township.

References
 USGS Geographic Names Information System (GNIS)

External links
 City-Data.com

Townships in Franklin County, Kansas
Townships in Kansas